István Krepuska (8 August 1899 — 14 March 1978) was a Hungarian ice hockey player. He played for the Hungarian national team at the 1928 Winter Olympics and several World Championships.

References

External links
 
 
 
 

1899 births
1978 deaths
Hungarian ice hockey defencemen
Ice hockey players at the 1928 Winter Olympics
Olympic ice hockey players of Hungary
Ice hockey people from Budapest